Matias Rajaniemi (born 2 September 2002) is a Finnish professional ice hockey defenceman for SaiPa of Liiga. Rajaniemi was drafted in the sixth round of the 2020 NHL Entry Draft by the New York Islanders with the 183rd overall pick.

Playing career
Rajaniemi played as a youth within the Lahti Pelicans organization before making his professional debut in the Liiga with the Pelicans during the 2019–20 season. He registered 2 assists through 12 games.

During his fourth season with the Pelicans, having featured in 6 games, Rajaniemi left the club to sign a two-year contract and immediately join SaiPa of the Liiga on 22 November 2022.

Career statistics

Regular season and playoffs

International

References

External links
 

2002 births
Living people
Finnish ice hockey defencemen
Lahti Pelicans players
Sportspeople from Lahti
New York Islanders draft picks
Peliitat Heinola players
SaiPa players